Jesuit High may refer to:

Jesuit High School (New Orleans) 
Jesuit High School (Tampa) 
Jesuit High School (Sacramento) 
Walsh Jesuit High School
Jesuit High School (Beaverton, Oregon) 
Jesuit College Preparatory School of Dallas - Texas
Regis Jesuit High School 
McQuaid Jesuit High School 
De Smet Jesuit High School
St. John's Jesuit High School and Academy
University of Detroit Jesuit High School and Academy 
Arrupe Jesuit High School 
Cristo Rey Network#List of schools, several schools in the U.S. 
Vilnius Jesuit High School in Lithuania